Harald Roger Erik Julius Christian de Scavenius (27 May 1873 – 24 April 1939) was Danish Foreign Minister from 5 May 1920 to 9 October 1922.

Before this appointment, he had previously occupied the position of Danish ambassador to Russia. Unlike his first cousin, Erik Scavenius, he advocated a strong anti-Communist policy and opposed Danish diplomatic recognition of the Soviet Union.
Regarding the Schleswig issue, he advocated a minimalist strategy, arguing that Denmark should only regain areas in which Danes were in a majority, believing that any other policy of action would place Denmark in great risk of German revanchism.

References

1873 births
1939 deaths
20th-century Danish diplomats
Danish anti-communists
Foreign ministers of Denmark
Ambassadors of Denmark to the Russian Empire
Scavenius family